The 1982 Swiss Grand Prix was a Formula One motor race held at Dijon-Prenois in France on 29 August 1982. The race, contested over 80 laps, was the fourteenth race of the 1982 Formula One season and was won by Keke Rosberg, driving a Williams-Ford. Alain Prost finished second in a Renault, having started from pole position, while Niki Lauda was third in a McLaren-Ford. This was the only win of the season for eventual World Champion Rosberg. The chequered flag was shown after 81 laps when the organizers / flag stand missed the leading car on lap 80.

This was the first World Championship Swiss Grand Prix since 1954 (despite it not being held in Switzerland), and the last running of the event to date. Switzerland had banned motor racing after the 1955 Le Mans disaster; as of 2021, the ban has been lifted for electric vehicles only. Patrick Tambay, Ferrari's only entry after team leader Didier Pironi's career-ending crash three weeks earlier, was unable to start due to a pinched nerve in his back. This was the last of only three times the Ferrari team did not start a World Championship race in which they entered (see also 1950 French Grand Prix and 1982 Belgian Grand Prix). Ferrari withdrew their entry so late that Chico Serra was not allowed to start as the reserve driver.

Classification

Qualifying

Race

Championship standings after the race

Drivers' Championship standings

Constructors' Championship standings

Note: Only the top five positions are included for both sets of standings.

References

Swiss Grand Prix
Swiss Grand Prix
Swiss Grand Prix
Swiss Grand Prix